In piping and plumbing, a coupling (or coupler) is a very short length of pipe or tube, with a socket at one or both ends that allows two pipes or tubes to be joined, welded (steel), brazed or soldered (copper, brass etc.) together.

Alternatively it is a short length of pipe with two female National pipe threads (NPT) (in North American terms, a coupler is a double female while a nipple is double male) or two male or female British standard pipe threads.

If the two ends of a coupling are of different standards or joining methods, the coupling is called an adapter. Examples of adapters include one end BSP threaded with the other NPT threaded, and one end threaded with the other a plain socket for brazing.

A coupling whose ends use the same connection method but are of different sizes is called a reducing coupling or reducer. An example is a 3/4" NPT to 1/2" NPT coupling.

See also

 Closet flange
 Eccentric reducer
 Nipple (plumbing)
 Piping and plumbing fittings
 Reducer
 Street elbow

Further reading
ASME B1.20.7 Hose Coupling Screw Threads, Inch. (Quote: The normal sequence of connections, in relation to the direction of flow, is from an externally threaded nipple into an internally threaded coupling)

External resources
PDF illustrating assorted adapters

Piping
Plumbing